Roepkiella siamica is a moth in the family Cossidae. It is found in Thailand and Myanmar.

References

Natural History Museum Lepidoptera generic names catalog

Cossinae